St Francis Xavier's Cathedral is a Roman Catholic cathedral in Adelaide, South Australia. It is classified as being a Gothic Revival building in the Early English style. The tower stands 36 m high and is 56.5 m lengthwise and 29.5 m horizontally. The foundation stone was laid in 1856 and the building was opened in 1858. The construction of the tower began in 1887. However, it was not completed until 1996.

History
In 1838, two years after the proclamation of South Australia, an advertisement was put up to organise religious meetings for South Australian Catholics. The first Mass was celebrated in a house on East Terrace in 1840. In 1845, a Catholic primary school was set up and used as the religious centre for Catholics until the foundation stone for a cathedral was laid in 1851 for a design by Richard Lambeth. However, with a gold rush in Victoria, Lambeth left along with many of the population, leaving no plans and with the community in economic depression.

The original foundation stone was put in place on 17 March 1856 by the vicar general, Father Michael Ryan, with the first part of the cathedral being dedicated on 11 July 1858. It was first extended when construction began at the southern end of the cathedral, including the sanctuary, side chapel, lady chapel and sacristy in January 1859. Construction of the first extension finished the following year in November 1860. With further growth in the population of Adelaide, another extension was required to seat more worshippers. In November 1886, Bishop Reynolds laid the foundation stone for an extension on the eastern side for a further 200 people, as well as new vestries and confessionals. These were completed in August the following year. In 1904, electric lighting was introduced.

The cornerstone of the current bell tower was laid in 1887, but the lower part was only built between 1923 and 1926 during expansion work on the cathedral, when the western aisle was also extended. The expanded building was opened in April 1926 by Archbishop Robert Spence.

On 8 March 1931, Spence dedicated the octagonal pulpit, designed by Adelaide architect Herbert Jory, with its intricate and detailed decoration carved out of Australian blackwood. It was erected as a memorial to Roman Catholic soldiers who had died in World War I and is regarded as an important example of church furniture.

It was not until 1996 that the bell tower was finally completed, by the architect Lynton Jury, 109 years after construction of the tower commenced. The bell used in the tower is the Murphy Bell of 1867, surrounded by thirteen other bells hung for change ringing, installed in 1996. Seven of these bells date from 1881 and were previously in St Mary's Cathedral, Sydney.

The cathedral suffered significant damage in the 1954 Adelaide earthquake.

Features 
Located at the north-western corner is a statue of St John the Baptist, which was carved in Tuscany in 1925 and features a picture of the baptism of Jesus. The lady chapel altar, located at the south-west, is made from Carrara marble with inset panels of simulated lapis lazuli (although many texts erroneously describe it as real) and was dedicated in 1954. Bronze statues of Joseph and Jesus and the flight into Egypt are also depicted on the western side of the cathedral. At the front of the cathedral, the southern end, are lancet windows featuring images of St Patrick and St Lawrence, as well depictions of the life of Mary and Jesus. The eastern side of the cathedral features a statue of St Patrick, the patron of the Archdiocese of Adelaide, with Celtic symbols prevalent in the surroundings.

The cathedral has had three organs throughout its history. The first was put in place in 1869 by Johann Wolff, with two pedals and one manual. It was replaced in 1926 by J. E. Dodd with two manuals, which was subsequently rebuilt in 1954.

The bells are rung by members of The Australian and New Zealand Association of Bellringers.

Services 
The cathedral is open daily from early morning until evening, with Mass celebrated three times daily. The cathedral also maintains a choir.

Gallery

See also
Fennescey House

References

Further reading

External links
 

Churches in Adelaide
Roman Catholic cathedrals in South Australia
Roman Catholic churches in South Australia
Gothic Revival architecture in Adelaide
Gothic Revival church buildings in Australia
South Australian Heritage Register